On November 13, 1979, sixteen people were killed by the government of Nepal at Chhintang VDC ward no-1, Dhankuta district of east Nepal for demanding democracy.

List of victims
A memorial to the victims is at Panchkanya Sahid Smriti Park in Chhintang. 
1. Rana Dhoj Rai
2. Lakhman Sadhu Rai
3. Gambhirman Damai
4. Tanka Bahadur BK
5. Dhan Bir Darji
6. Ganga Bahadur Tupihang
7. Kesharman Rai
8. Gopal Anana Rai
9. Chandra Bahadur Darji
10. Ganesh Bahadur Biswokarma
11. Putra Man Thulung Rai
12. Bal Bahadur Khatri
13. Hang Khila Sahilee (Shree Maya Rai)
14. Jhagendra Rai
15. Bhairab Bahadur Rai

References

Politicides
1979 in Nepal
November 1979 events in Asia
Massacres in 1979
1979 murders in Asia
1979 crimes in Nepal
Massacres in Nepal
1970s murders in Nepal